Guillermo Szeszurak (born October 16, 1971 in Buenos Aires) is a former Argentine football player.

Szeszurak joined River Plate. He made his debut in the season 1989/90 for the Excursionistas.

Szeszurak also played for Los Andes, Laferrere in Argentina and F.C. Felgueiras in Portugal.

Titles
 National B: 1994

References

External links 
 Guillermo Szeszurak at BDFA.com.ar 

1971 births
Argentine footballers
Club Atlético Los Andes footballers
F.C. Felgueiras players
Expatriate footballers in Portugal
Argentine people of Ukrainian descent
Living people
Association football forwards
Footballers from Buenos Aires